InSinkErator is an American company and brand name known for producing instant hot water dispensers and food waste disposal systems, generally called "garbage disposals" or "garbage disposers".

History
Architect John W. Hammes founded the company in Racine, Wisconsin, where it remains headquartered. Hammes is credited with inventing the "in-sink" food waste disposal in 1927 for his wife. It works by grinding and shredding solid food waste, using centrifugal force. He spent ten years improving the design and went into business selling the appliance. His company was called the In-Sink-Erator Manufacturing Company. The name is a play on the word "incinerator" and refers to the fact that the mouth of the disposal unit is located "in" the "sink".

The company was purchased by Emerson Electric in 1968. In 2006, In-Sink-Erator removed the hyphens from its name, becoming InSinkErator. It also redesigned the company logo and released a re-engineered line of high technology disposers branded as the Evolution Series.

On November 1, 2022, InSinkErator was acquired by Whirlpool Corporation.

References

External links
 InSinkErator
 InSinkErator at Facebook

2022 mergers and acquisitions
1927 establishments in Wisconsin
Home appliance brands
Home appliance manufacturers of the United States
Companies based in Racine, Wisconsin